is a passenger railway station in located in the city of Higashiōmi,  Shiga Prefecture, Japan, operated by the private railway operator Ohmi Railway. It is on the border of the city, and the platform extends into the neighboring town of Hino.

Lines
Asahino Station is served by the Ohmi Railway Main Line, and is located 37.8 rail kilometers from the terminus of the line at Maibara Station.

Station layout
The station consists of one side platform serving a single bi-directional track. There is no station building, but only a shelter on the platform. The station is unattended.

Platforms

Adjacent stations

History
Asahino Station was opened on December 28, 1900.

Passenger statistics
In fiscal 2019, the station was used by an average of 28 passengers daily (boarding passengers only).

Surroundings
 Takeda Shrine
 Asahino Post Office

See also
List of railway stations in Japan

References

External links

 Ohmi Railway official site 

Railway stations in Japan opened in 1900
Railway stations in Shiga Prefecture
Higashiōmi